Entamoebidae is a family of Archamoebae.

It includes Entamoeba and Entamoebites.

References

Amoebozoa families